Sudden infant death syndrome (SIDS) is the sudden unexplained death of a child of less than one year of age. Diagnosis requires that the death remain unexplained even after a thorough autopsy and detailed death scene investigation. SIDS usually occurs during sleep. Typically death occurs between the hours of midnight and 9:00 a.m. There is usually no noise or evidence of struggle. SIDS remains the leading cause of infant mortality in Western countries, contributing to half of all post-neonatal deaths.

The exact cause of SIDS is unknown. The requirement of a combination of factors including a specific underlying susceptibility, a specific time in development, and an environmental stressor has been proposed. These environmental stressors may include sleeping on the stomach or side, overheating, and exposure to tobacco smoke. Accidental suffocation from bed sharing (also known as co-sleeping) or soft objects may also play a role. Another risk factor is being born before 39 weeks of gestation. SIDS makes up about 80% of sudden and unexpected infant deaths (SUIDs). The other 20% of cases are often caused by infections, genetic disorders, and heart problems. While child abuse in the form of intentional suffocation may be misdiagnosed as SIDS, this is believed to make up less than 5% of sudden death cases.

The most effective method of reducing the risk of SIDS is putting a child less than one year old on their back to sleep. Other measures include a firm mattress separate from but close to caregivers, no loose bedding, a relatively cool sleeping environment, using a pacifier, and avoiding exposure to tobacco smoke. Breastfeeding and immunization may also be preventive. Measures not shown to be useful include positioning devices and baby monitors. Evidence is not sufficient for the use of fans. Grief support for families affected by SIDS is important, as the death of the infant is sudden, without witnesses, and often associated with an investigation.

Rates of SIDS vary nearly tenfold in developed countries from one in a thousand to one in ten thousand. Globally, it resulted in about 19,200 deaths in 2015, down from 22,000 deaths in 1990. SIDS was the third leading cause of death in children less than one year old in the United States in 2011. It is the most common cause of death between one month and one year of age. About 90% of cases happen before six months of age, with it being most frequent between two months and four months of age. It is more common in boys than girls. Rates of SIDS have decreased in areas with "safe sleep" campaigns by up to 80%.

Definition 
The syndrome only applies to infants under one. SIDS is a diagnosis of exclusion and should be applied to only those cases in which an infant's death is sudden and unexpected, and remains unexplained after the performance of an adequate postmortem investigation, including:
 an autopsy (by an experienced pediatric pathologist, if possible);
 investigation of the death scene and circumstances of the death; and
 exploration of the medical history of the infant and family.

After investigation, some of these infant deaths are found to be caused by suffocation, hyperthermia or hypothermia, neglect or some other defined cause.

Australia and New Zealand shifted to sudden unexpected death in infancy (SUDI) for professional, scientific, and coronial clarity.
 In addition, the US Centers for Disease Control and Prevention have proposed that such deaths be called sudden unexpected infant deaths (SUID) and that SIDS is a subset of SUID.

Age
SIDS has a four-parameter lognormal age distribution that spares infants shortly after birth — the time of maximal risk for almost all other causes of non-trauma infant death.

By definition, SIDS deaths occur under the age of one year, with the peak incidence occurring when the infant is two to four months old. This is considered a critical period because the infant's ability to rouse from sleep is not yet mature.

Risk factors
The exact cause of SIDS is unknown. Although studies have identified risk factors for SIDS, such as putting infants to bed on their bellies, there has been little understanding of the syndrome's biological process or its potential causes. Deaths from SIDS are unlikely to be due to a single cause, but rather to multiple risk factors. The frequency of SIDS does appear to be influenced by social, economic, or cultural factors, such as maternal education, race or ethnicity, or poverty. SIDS is believed to occur when an infant with an underlying biological vulnerability, who is at a critical development age, is exposed to an external trigger. The following risk factors generally contribute either to the underlying biological vulnerability or represent an external trigger:

Tobacco smoke
SIDS rates are higher in babies of mothers who smoke during pregnancy. Between no smoking and smoking one cigarette a day, on average, the risk doubles. About 22% of SIDS in the United States is related to maternal smoking. SIDS correlates with levels of nicotine and its derivatives in the baby. Nicotine and derivatives cause alterations in neurodevelopment.

Sleeping
Placing an infant to sleep while lying on the belly or side rather than on the back increases the risk for SIDS. This increased risk is greatest at two to three months of age. Elevated or reduced room temperature also increases the risk, as does excessive bedding, clothing, soft sleep surfaces, and stuffed animals in the bed. Bumper pads may increase the risk of SIDS due to the risk of suffocation. They are not recommended for children under one year of age, as this risk of suffocation greatly outweighs the risk of head bumping or limbs getting stuck in the bars of the crib.

Sharing a bed with parents or siblings increases the risk for SIDS. This risk is greatest in the first three months of life, when the mattress is soft, when one or more persons share the infant's bed, especially when the bed partners are using drugs or alcohol or are smoking. The risk remains, however, even in parents who do not smoke or use drugs. The American Academy of Pediatrics thus recommends "room-sharing without bed-sharing", stating that such an arrangement can decrease the risk of SIDS by up to 50%. Furthermore, the academy has recommended against devices marketed to make bed-sharing "safe", such as "in-bed co-sleepers".

Room sharing as opposed to solitary sleeping is known to decrease the risk of SIDS.

Breastfeeding
Breastfeeding is associated with a lower risk of SIDS. It is not clear if co-sleeping among mothers who breastfeed without any other risk factors increases SIDS risk.

Pregnancy and infant factors
SIDS rates decrease with increasing maternal age, with teenage mothers at greatest risk. Delayed or inadequate prenatal care also increases risk. Low birth weight is a significant risk factor. In the United States from 1995 to 1998, the SIDS death rate for infants weighing 1000–1499 g was 2.89/1000, while for a birth weight of 3500–3999 g, it was only 0.51/1000. Premature birth increases the risk of SIDS death roughly fourfold. From 1995 to 1998, the U.S. SIDS rate for births at 37–39 weeks of gestation was 0.73/1000, while the SIDS rate for births at 28–31 weeks of gestation was 2.39/1000.

Anemia has also been linked to SIDS (however, per item 6 in the list of epidemiologic characteristics below, extent of anemia cannot be evaluated at autopsy because an infant's total hemoglobin can only be measured during life). SIDS incidence rises from zero at birth, is highest from two to four months of age, and declines toward zero after the infant's first year.

Genetics
Genetics plays a role, as SIDS is more prevalent in males. There is a consistent 50% male excess in SIDS per 1000 live births of each sex. Given a 5% male excess birth rate, there appears to be 3.15 male SIDS cases per 2 female cases, for a male fraction of 0.61. This value of 61% in the US is an average of 57% black male SIDS, 62.2% white male SIDS and 59.4% for all other races combined. Note that when multiracial parentage is involved, infant race is arbitrarily assigned to one category or the other; most often it is chosen by the mother. The X-linkage hypothesis for SIDS and the male excess in infant mortality have shown that the 50% male excess might be related to a dominant X-linked allele, occurring with a frequency of  that is protective against transient cerebral anoxia.

About 10 to 20% of SIDS cases are believed to be due to channelopathies, which are inherited defects in the ion channels which play an important role in the contraction of the heart.

Genetic evidence published in November 2020 concerning the case of Kathleen Folbigg, who is in prison over the death of four of her children, showed that at least two of the children had genetic mutations in the CALM2 gene that predisposed them to heart complications.

Alcohol
Drinking of alcohol by parents is linked to SIDS. One study found a positive correlation between the two during New Years celebrations and weekends. Another found that alcohol use disorder was linked to a more than doubling of risk.

Other
A 2022 study found that infants who died of SIDS exhibited significantly lower specific activity of butyrylcholinesterase, an enzyme involved in the brain's arousal pathway, shortly after birth. This can serve as a biomarker to identify infants with a potential autonomic cholinergic dysfunction and elevated risk for SIDS.

SIDS has been linked to cold weather, with this association believed to be due to over-bundling and thus, overheating. Premature babies are at four times the risk of SIDS, possibly related to an underdeveloped ability to automatically control the cardiovascular system.

A 1998 report found that antimony- and phosphorus-containing compounds used as fire retardants in PVC and other cot mattress materials are not a cause of SIDS. The report also states that toxic gas cannot be generated from antimony in mattresses and that babies had SIDS on mattresses that did not contain the compound.

It has been suggested that some cases of SIDS may be related to Staphylococcus aureus and Escherichia coli infections.

Diagnosis

Differential diagnosis
Some conditions that are often undiagnosed and could be confused with or comorbid with SIDS include:
 medium-chain acyl-coenzyme A dehydrogenase deficiency (MCAD deficiency);
 infant botulism;
 long QT syndrome (accounting for less than 2% of cases);
 Helicobacter pylori bacterial infections;
 shaken baby syndrome and other forms of child abuse;
overlaying, child smothering during carer's sleep

For example, an infant with MCAD deficiency might die by "classical SIDS" if found swaddled and prone, with its head covered, in an overheated room where parents were smoking. Genes indicating susceptibility to MCAD and Long QT syndrome do not protect an infant from dying of classical SIDS. Therefore, the presence of a susceptibility gene, such as for MCAD, means the infant might have died either from SIDS or from MCAD deficiency. It is currently impossible for a pathologist to distinguish between them.

A 2010 study looked at 554 autopsies of infants in North Carolina that listed SIDS as the cause of death, and suggested that many of these deaths may have been due to accidental suffocation.  The study found that 69% of autopsies listed other possible risk factors that could have led to death, such as unsafe bedding or sleeping with adults.

Several instances of infanticide have been uncovered in which the diagnosis was originally SIDS. The estimate of the percentage of SIDS deaths that are actually infanticide varies from less than 1% to up to 5% of cases.

Some have underestimated the risk of two SIDS deaths occurring in the same family; the Royal Statistical Society issued a media release refuting expert testimony in one UK case, in which the conviction was subsequently overturned.

Prevention
A number of measures have been found to be effective in preventing SIDS, including changing the sleeping position to supine, breastfeeding, limiting soft bedding, immunizing the infant and using pacifiers. The use of electronic monitors has not been found to be useful as a preventative strategy. The effect that fans might have on the risk of SIDS has not been studied well enough to make any recommendation about them. Evidence regarding swaddling is unclear regarding SIDS. A 2016 review found tentative evidence that swaddling increases the risk of SIDS, especially among babies placed on their bellies or sides while sleeping.

Measures not shown to be useful include positioning devices and baby monitors. In the United States, companies that sell the monitors do not have FDA approval for them as medical devices.

Sleep positioning

Sleeping on the back has been found to reduce the risk of SIDS. It is thus recommended by the American Academy of Pediatrics and promoted as a best practice by the US National Institute of Child Health and Human Development (NICHD) "Safe to Sleep" campaign. The incidence of SIDS has fallen in a number of countries in which this recommendation has been widely adopted. Sleeping on the back does not appear to increase the risk of choking, even in those with gastroesophageal reflux disease. While infants in this position may sleep more lightly, this is not harmful. Sharing the same room as the parents but in a different bed may decrease the SIDS risk by half.

Pacifiers
The use of pacifiers appears to decrease the risk of SIDS, although the reason is unclear. The American Academy of Pediatrics considers pacifier use to prevent SIDS to be reasonable. Pacifiers do not appear to affect breastfeeding in the first four months, even though this is a common misconception.

Bedding
Product safety experts advise against using pillows, overly soft mattresses, sleep positioners, bumper pads (crib bumpers), stuffed animals, or fluffy bedding in the crib, and recommend instead dressing the child warmly and keeping the crib "naked."

Blankets or other clothing should not be placed over a baby's head.

The use of a "baby sleep bag" or "sleep sack", a soft bag with holes for the baby's arms and head can be used as a type of bedding that warms the baby without covering its head.

Vaccination

Infants typically receive several vaccinations between the ages of 2 and 4 months, which is also the peak age for SIDS. Due to this coincidence, a number of studies have investigated the possible role of vaccinations as a cause of SIDS. These have found either no relation between vaccinations and SIDS, or a reduction of the risk of SIDS following vaccination. A 2007 meta-analysis found that vaccinations were associated with a halving of the risk of SIDS, and argued that immunisation should be a part of SIDS prevention campaigns.

Epidemiology

Globally, SIDS resulted in about 22,000 deaths , down from 30,000 deaths in 1990. Rates vary significantly by population from 0.05 per 1000 in Hong Kong to 6.7 per 1000 in Native Americans.

SIDS was responsible for 0.54 deaths per 1,000 live births in the US in 2005. It is responsible for far fewer deaths than congenital disorders and disorders related to short gestation, though it is the leading cause of death in healthy infants after one month of age.

SIDS deaths in the US decreased from 4,895 in 1992 to 2,247 in 2004, a 54% decrease. During a similar time period, 1989 to 2004, SIDS as the cause of death for sudden infant death (SID) decreased from 80% to 55%, a 31% decrease. According to John Kattwinkel, chairman of the Centers for Disease Control and Prevention (CDC) Special Task Force on SIDS "A lot of us are concerned that the rate (of SIDS) isn't decreasing significantly, but that a lot of it is just code shifting".

Race

In 2013, there were persistent disparities in SIDS deaths among racial and ethnic groups in the U.S. In 2009, the rates of death range from 20.3 per 100,000 live births for Asian/Pacific Islander to 119.2 per 100,000 live births for Native Americans/Alaska Native. African American infants have a 24% greater risk of having a SIDS-related death, compared to the U.S. population as a whole, and experience a 2.5 greater incidence of SIDS than in Caucasian infants. Rates are calculated per 100,000 live births to enable more accurate comparison across groups of different total population size.

Research suggests that factors which contribute more directly to SIDS risk—maternal age, exposure to smoking, safe sleep practices, etc.—vary by racial and ethnic group and therefore risk exposure also varies by these groups. Risk factors associated with prone sleeping patterns of African American families include mother's age, household poverty index, rural/urban status of residence, and infant's age. More than 50% of African American infants were placed in non-recommended sleeping positions, according to a 2012  study completed in South Carolina, indicating that cultural factors can be protective as well as problematic.

The rate of SIDS per 1000 births varies among ethnic groups in the United States:
Central Americans and South Americans: 0.20
Asian/Pacific Islanders: 0.28
Mexicans: 0.24
Puerto Ricans: 0.53
Whites: 0.51
African Americans: 1.08
Native American: 1.24

Society and culture

The rate of SIDS varies vastly among different cultures and countries around the world, with SIDS rates lowest among Asian and Pacific Islander infants. Some evidence supports the hypothesis that SIDS is not an ancient phenomenon and that it appears more commonly in western societies.

Much of the popular media portrayals of infants shows them in non-recommended sleeping positions.

See also 

Fading puppy syndrome
Failure to thrive
Neonatal isoerythrolysis
Newborn care and safety
Sudden unexpected death syndrome
Sudden unexplained death in childhood

References

Further reading

External links 

 

Causes of death
Ailments of unknown cause
Infant mortality
Wikipedia medicine articles ready to translate
Sleep disorders
Syndromes